Tomorrowland Terrace is a restaurant located in Tomorrowland at Disneyland in Anaheim, California that is notable for its unique concert stage, which hydraulically rises out of the ground. It opened with the new Tomorrowland in 1967. Magic Kingdom at Walt Disney World has a restaurant also called Tomorrowland Terrace, which was once called the Plaza Pavilion, and that park's current Cosmic Ray's Starlight Cafe was once known as Tomorrowland Terrace before the 1995 makeover.

History

Early years

The restaurant was sponsored by Coca-Cola from its opening in 1967 until Tomorrowland was redesigned in 1998. The stage's original large planters and space age spires were replaced with a retro-futuristic design to match the Jules Verne-like design of the new Tomorrowland.

In 2000, Tomorrowland Terrace was renamed Club Buzz, as it started hosted a show called "Calling All Space Scouts: A Buzz Lightyear Adventure." The 1998 designs were replaced with a Buzz Lightyear theme. A large sign was added above the stage with the words "Club Buzz" and a small sign with the subtitle, "Lightyear's Above the Rest." When the show ended, the Buzz Lightyear theme was mostly removed along with the large sign. The smaller sign that formerly read "Lightyears Above the Rest" then read "Club Buzz."

In 2006, the stage was redesigned again, and is an updated version of the original 1967 design, with large bowl-shaped planters and tall spires, with colors of white, silver, and blue, going with the Tomorrowland and Space Mountain theme. The restaurant and stage reverted to the original name; Tomorrowland Terrace.

Entertainment
 Disney Holiday Dance Party
 Stitch's Interplanetary Beach Party Blast

Former entertainment
 Mermaids (1959, 1965-1967)
 Hamm's All-Doll Revue (1996)
 TLT Dance Club (2009-2010)
 Jedi Training Academy (2015-2018)
 Pixar Pals Dance Party (2018)
 The Kids of the Kingdom
The Police played here in October 1979.

Among the artists that have performed multiple times over the years at Tomorrowland Terrace include Tomasina, Voyager, Krash, Lazer, The Fab Four, Scot Bruce, Papa Doo Run Run, The '80z All Stars, Suburban Legends, Michael Iceberg and The Bolts. More recently, the duo Aly and AJ performed in 2006 during Disney's 50th Anniversary Happiest Homecoming on Earth Celebration at the Tomorrowland Terrace.

Present
It currently hosts the Jedi Training Academy, where children between the ages of 4 and 12 are randomly chosen to participate in the show to become Jedi padawan and face off Star Wars antagonists.

References
Yesterland.com

Restaurants at Disneyland
Tomorrowland
Walt Disney Parks and Resorts restaurants
Walt Disney Parks and Resorts entertainment
Restaurants established in 1955
1955 establishments in California
Walt Disney World restaurants
Magic Kingdom
Disneyland